Parachaenichthys is a genus of marine ray-finned fish belonging to the family Bathydraconidae, the Antarctic dragonfishes. They are found in the Southern Ocean around Antarctica.

Taxonomy
Parachaenichthys was first described as a genus in 1902 by the  Belgian-born British ichthyologist George Albert Boulenger with Chaenichthys georgianus designated as the type species by monotypy, i.e. it was the only species in the new genus at the time of genus description. Chaenichthys georgianus had been described in 1885 by the German zoologist J.G. Fischer with the type locality given as South Georgia. The genus name Parachaenichthys is a compound of para meaning "near" or "similar to" and Chaenichthys, i.e. Channichthys the genus P. georgianus was originally placed in by Fischer.

Species
There are currently two recognised species in this genus:
 Parachaenichthys charcoti (Vaillant, 1906)
 Parachaenichthys georgianus (J. G. Fischer, 1885)

Characteristics
Parachaenichthys dragonfishes have a naked body, lacking in scales, except for lateral line scales. They have a long , broad snout and the jaws have multiple bands of small, canine-like teeth.  The operculum has a clear ridge which splits up into subridges towards the rear margin, each of these subridges ends in a spine.  P. charcoti attains a maximum standard length of  while P. georgianus reaches .

Distribution, habitat and biology

References

Bathydraconidae
Fish of Antarctica
Marine fish genera
Taxa named by George Albert Boulenger
Fish described in 1902